William Myles Knighton CB (born 1931) is a former senior British civil servant.

Biography

Born on 8 September 1931, William Myles Knighton was educated at Bedford School and at Peterhouse, Cambridge.  He was Principal Private Secretary to the Minister of Technology between 1966 and 1968, Assistant Secretary at the Department of Trade between 1967 and 1974, Under Secretary at the Department of Trade between 1974 and 1978, Deputy Secretary at the Department of Trade between 1978 and 1983, Deputy Secretary at the Department for Transport between 1983 and 1986, and Principal Establishment and Finance Officer at the Department of Trade and Industry between 1986 and 1991.

References

1931 births
People educated at Bedford School
Alumni of Peterhouse, Cambridge
Companions of the Order of the Bath
Living people